The Libertarian Party of Kansas (LPKS) is the Kansas affiliate of the Libertarian Party. Since 2007 the Libertarian Party of Kansas has been the fastest growing political party in the state of Kansas.  The LPKS earned full ballot access in 1992 as a minor party, with Libertarian candidates appearing on every statewide general election ballot since then.

Since 2010 the party has pursued major party status which would give them the same primary ballot access enjoyed by the Republican and Democratic parties.  To achieve major party status, their candidate for Governor of Kansas, needs to receive 5% or more of the statewide vote in the general election, but failed to do so in past elections while they garner more votes each election cycle.

The Libertarian Party of Kansas has taken the lead in many civil rights issues in Kansas, including protection of the 2nd amendment.

See also
 List of state Libertarian Parties in the United States

References

External links
  Libertarian Party of Kansas web page
 Libertarian Party of Kansas page on Facebook
 

Kansas
Political parties in Kansas
Politics of Kansas